The 1894 European Figure Skating Championships were held on January 28 in Vienna, Austria. Elite figure skaters competed for the title of European Champion in the category of men's singles. The competitors performed only compulsory figures.

Results

Men

Judges:
 Oskar Uhlig 
 J. Ehrlich 
 O. Rpp 
 R. Holletschek 
 M. Mitscha 
 L. Friedemann 
 J. Schönbach 
 G. Wasmuth

References

Sources
 Result List provided by the ISU

European Figure Skating Championships, 1894
European Figure Skating Championships
International figure skating competitions hosted by Austria
1894 in Austrian sport
Sports competitions in Vienna
January 1894 sports events
1890s in Vienna